Chamapur is a village in yadadribhongir district in Telangana, India. It falls under motakondurmandal.

References

Villages in Nalgonda district